Lenswood is a semi-rural village situated in the Adelaide Hills east of Adelaide, South Australia. The major industries are apples, pears, cherries and wine grapes.

History
Lenswood is the youngest township in the Adelaide Hills. Prior to its establishment, it was part of Forest Range. In 1917, towards the end of the First World War, a new township was proclaimed between Forest Range and Lobethal. It was given the name Lenswood, after a recent battle near the town of Lens in northwestern France.

Originally, the main industry was cutting stringybark trees for timber. As these were cleared, the land was planted with orchards, which remains the major industry of the area to the present day. The district predominantly supplies apples, pears and cherries to local, interstate overseas markets. More recently, several vineyards have been established.

Lenswood's central position in the Adelaide Hills orchard districts led to a large cold storage facility being built there in 1933. Called the Lenswood Coldstore Cooperative, the facility has storage for 400,000 bushels of fruit, processing mostly apples, pears and cherries.

Geography
The township settlement is spread through a narrow river valley in one of the tributaries to the Onkaparinga River. Consequently, the town centre is far from centralised.
Businesses including the cold store operations are to be found on the main roads and set back from the Adelaide – Lobethal Road. The narrow nature of the valleys have allowed an elongated and incomplete ribbon development along this main road.

The location has its own oval (Lenswood Memorial Park) on Swamp Road with another oval at the school and a Recreation Park on Lobethal Road.  Lenswood relies on larger services being provided from other townships including Lobethal, Woodside, Balhannah and Summertown.

Facilities
Lenswood is home to several facilities. These include:
 The Lenswood Primary School 
 The Lenswood Uniting Church 
 The Lenswood Church of Christ
 The Lenswood General Store & Post Office
 Lenswood/Forest Range CFS
 Lenswood Ranges Cricket Club
 HILLS ARCHERS (target archery Club)

See also
 Adelaide Hills Council

References

External links
 Weather